Yōsuke Kon (今洋祐) (born September 21, 1978) is a Japanese retired professional ice hockey Center.

He played for the Seibu Tetsudo Tokyo between 2001 and 2003; for the Kokudo Tokyo/Seibu Prince Rabbits from 2000 to 2009; for the Oji Eagles from 2009 to 2013; High1 from 2013 to 2014; and the Nippon Paper Cranes between 2014 and 2016. He also played for the Japan national team from 2000 to 2011.

References

Oji Eagle's players profile

1978 births
Living people
High1 players
Sportspeople from Hokkaido
Japanese ice hockey centres
Kokudo Keikaku players
Nippon Paper Cranes players
Oji Eagles players
Seibu Prince Rabbits players
Asian Games gold medalists for Japan
Asian Games silver medalists for Japan
Medalists at the 2003 Asian Winter Games
Medalists at the 2007 Asian Winter Games
Medalists at the 2011 Asian Winter Games
Ice hockey players at the 2003 Asian Winter Games
Ice hockey players at the 2007 Asian Winter Games
Ice hockey players at the 2011 Asian Winter Games
Asian Games medalists in ice hockey